Maalaala Mo Kaya (abbreviated MMK), also known as Memories in English, is a Philippine anthology series, which was first aired on May 15, 1991. MMK is the longest-running drama anthology on Philippine television. However due to franchise renewal controversy over the network giant ABS-CBN, it shown limitedly on Kapamilya Channel, Kapamilya Online Live, A2Z Channel 11, and on iWant TFC and Official YouTube channel of ABS-CBN Entertainment.

Episodes

References 

2021 Philippine television seasons
Maalaala Mo Kaya